Anarsia guiera is a moth in the family Gelechiidae. It was described by John David Bradley in 1969 and is found in northern Nigeria.

Larvae have been recorded feeding within galls made on Guiera senegalensis.

References

guiera
Moths described in 1969
Moths of Africa